The Gewehr 98 (abbreviated G98, Gew 98, or M98) is a German bolt-action rifle made by Mauser, firing cartridges from a five-round internal clip-loaded magazine. It was the German service rifle from 1898 to 1935, when it was replaced by the Karabiner 98k, a shorter weapon using the same basic design. The Gewehr 98 action, using a stripper clip loaded with the 7.92×57mm Mauser cartridge, successfully combined and improved several bolt-action engineering concepts which were soon adopted by many other countries, including the United Kingdom, United States, and Japan. The Gewehr 98 replaced the earlier Gewehr 1888 as the main German service rifle. It first saw combat in the Chinese Boxer Rebellion and was the main German infantry service rifle of World War I. The Gewehr 98 saw further military use by the Ottoman Empire and Nationalist Spain.

History
The Gewehr 98 was introduced into German military service in 1898, replacing the Gewehr 1888. The bolt-action design was the latest refinement of the 1895 design patented by Paul Mauser on 9 September 1895.  Mauser was already selling similar 1895-design weapons to many other countries and had supplied less advanced Mauser rifles to the German Army from 1871 to 1888. The 1888 replacement for the Mauser was an internal design from the army, but failed through an impractical design. In the interim decade, Mauser rifles became recognized as the world standard, and the German Army became outclassed by a German-made product in the hands of others.

The German Gewehr-Prüfungskommission (G.P.K.) (rifle testing commission) adopted the Gewehr 98 on 5 April 1898. The action was derived from the experimental Gewehr 96 rifle. In 1901, the first troop issues of the Gewehr 98 rifles were made to the East Asian Expeditionary Force, the Imperial German Navy, and three premier Prussian army corps. The first combat use of the Gewehr 98 was during the Boxer Rebellion (1898–1901). In 1904, contracts were placed with Waffenfabrik Mauser for 290,000 rifles and Deutsche Waffen und Munitionsfabriken (DWM) for 210,000 rifles. At the outbreak of WWI in 1914, the German Army had 2,273,080 Mauser 98-rifles of all types; an additional 7,000,000 were produced during the war.

The 8 mm M/88 cartridge which was introduced in 1888 and loaded with an 8.08 mm (.318 in) 14.6 g (226 gr) round nose bullet was replaced on 3 April 1903, by the 7.92×57mm Mauser S Patrone (S ball cartridge) which was loaded with a new 8.20 mm (.323 in) 9.9 g (154 gr) spitzer bullet. The ammunition conversion was indicated by a small S stamped above the chamber and on the barrel at the back of the rear sight base. This was done since the 1888 pattern M/88 cartridge and 1903 S-bore pattern cartridge are two different non-interchangeable chamberings. Since the new IS cartridge had a flatter trajectory the Lange Visier rear sight had to be changed with an "S"-adapted Lange Visier.

Design details
The Gewehr 98 has two sling swivels, open front sights, and a curved tangent-type rear sight, known as the Lange Visier.

The controlled-feed bolt-action of the Gewehr 98 is a distinct feature and is regarded as one of the major bolt-action system designs.

M98 controlled-feed bolt-action system

The controlled-feed Mauser M98 bolt-action system is based on previous 19th-century Mauser bolt-action rifle designs and is a simple, strong, safe, and well-thought-out design intended to negate as many failure modes as possible and which inspired other military and hunting/sporting rifle designs that became available during the 20th century. A drawback of the M98 system is that it cannot be cheaply mass-produced very easily. Some other bolt-action designs (e.g. the Lee–Enfield and Pattern 1914 Enfield/M1917 Enfield) offer trained operators a faster rate of fire as the ergonomic relation between the bolt handle and trigger is more favorable and they can be cycled without loss of sight picture.

Features
The M98 system consists of a receiver that serves as the system's shroud and a bolt group of which the bolt body has three locking lugs, two large main lugs at the bolt head and a third safety lug at the rear of the bolt, which serves as a backup in case the primary locking lugs failed. This third lug is a distinctive feature and was not present on previous Mauser bolt-action designs. The diameter of the M98 system receiver ring was also enlarged to  diameter compared to previous Mauser "small ring" bolt-action designs that had  diameter receiver rings for additional strength and safety. The bolt handle is permanently attached to the bolt and, on the Gewehr 98, is straight and protrudes out for optimal leverage.

Another distinctive feature of the M98 system is the controlled-feed mechanism, consisting of a large, non-rotating claw extractor that engages the cartridge case rim as soon as the round leaves the magazine and firmly holds the cartridge case until the round is ejected by the ejector, mounted inside the receiver. Combined with a slight bolt retraction at the last stage of the bolt opening cycle, caused by the cammed surface on the rear receiver bridge, this results in a positive cartridge case extraction. The M98 bolt-action will cycle correctly, irrespective of the way the rifle is moved or positioned during the bolt cycling action or if the cartridge has been fired or not. Only if the bolt is not brought back far enough, sharply enough, in a controlled round feed bolt-action the cartridge case may not be cleanly ejected and a jam may result.

The bolt houses the firing pin mechanism that cocks when the bolt is opened, and the cocking piece protrudes visually and tactilely from the rear of the bolt to indicate the action is cocked. A cocking shroud lock that was not present on previous Mauser bolt-action designs was added. The distance the firing pin needs to travel was decreased to reduce and hence improve lock time – the amount of time between initiating the firing sequence by releasing the trigger and the firing pin striking the primer that ignites the propellant contained in the 7.92×57mm Mauser cartridge.

The M98 action features two large oval shaped gas relief holes on the bottom of the bolt, which when catastrophic failures like a primer, cartridge rupture or detonation occur relieve high pressure gases into the magazine, and a gas shield on the bolt sleeve. Military M98 systems feature a secondary gas relief where gas is routed down the locking lug raceway to a thumb hole cutout exit on left side of receiver. Civilian M98 systems often lack the thumb hole cut out, as the ammunition feeding is generally simplified to single round feeding only. These safety features are designed to route escaping gas out of the bolt and eventual debris away from the operator's face.

The M98 bolt group can be easily removed from the receiver simply by rotating the safety lever to the 12 o'clock position and pulling out the bolt stop lever, located at the rear left wall of the receiver, and then operate the action and continue rearward bolt travel past the bolt stop. The metal disc inlay in the stock functions as a bolt disassembly tool.

Many metal parts of the Gewehr 98 were blued, a process in which steel is partially protected against rust by a layer of magnetite (Fe3O4). Such a thin black oxide layer provides minimal protection against rust or corrosion, unless also treated with a water-displacing oil to reduce wetting and galvanic corrosion. From 1905 until 1945 the German military used Ballistol intended for cleaning, lubricating, and protecting metallic, wooden and leather firearms parts.

Safety
A three-position safety attached at the rear of the bolt which operating lever can be flicked from right (safety on, bolt locked) to middle (safety on, bolt can be opened for reloading), to left (ready to fire), but only when the rifle is cocked; otherwise, the safety will not move. The safety secures the firing pin. The safety catch lever is quite large, making it easy to operate, but posing a problem for mounting telescopic sights low above the receiver whilst retaining good operability of the safety catch lever.

Ammunition feeding
The internal magazine of the M98 system consists of an integral box machined to match the cartridge for which the rifle was being chambered, with a detachable floorplate, that can hold up to 5 rifle cartridges. The cartridges are stored in the magazine box in a staggered column at a stacking angle of 30 degrees, so viewed from the end, three cartridges touching each other form the points of an equilateral triangle. The magazine can be loaded with single rounds by pushing the cartridges into the receiver top opening or via stripper clips. Each stripper clip can hold 5 rounds to fill the magazine and is inserted into clip guides machined into the rear receiver bridge. After loading, the empty clip is ejected when the bolt is closed. For easier loading a crescent shaped thumb hole cutout is present at the left rear of the receiver top. The magazine can be unloaded by operating the bolt (the safety should, for safety reasons, be set to the middle position for this) or, in case of mechanical problems, by opening the magazine floorplate, which is flush with the stock, with the help of a cartridge tip.
Alternatively cartridges can be loaded singly directly into the chamber, as is standard on military rifles of the period, since the extractor is spring-loaded and designed so the extractor claw "pops" over the rim of the cartridge on closing.

The Gewehr 98 had no magazine cut-off mechanism, which when engaged permits the feeding and extraction of single cartridges only while keeping the cartridges in the magazine in reserve. Like the M98 system Mauser magazine fed bolt-action systems were generally not manufactured with magazine cut-offs, the Ottoman Mauser Model 1893 variant being the exception.

Modern civilian offspring of the M98 system
Though the production of the M98 system for the German military ceased at the end of World War II in 1945, the production of new Mauser M 98 and Mauser M 98 Magnum rifles for civil users has been resumed in 1999 by Mauser Jagdwaffen GmbH (Mauser Hunting Weapons Ltd.), according to original drawings of 1936 and the respective Mauser patents. These rifles retail (2009) for approximately EUR 6,800 for the basic Mauser M 98 version, but the addition of (luxury) options can make these rifles much more expensive. Several other gun manufacturers and custom gun builders also currently produce new M98 system clones or M98 inspired bolt-action hunting/sporting rifles. Desirable features of the M98 system, like its controlled feeding, were carried over to a host of later bolt-action designs. These designs feature technical alterations to simplify production and technical and ergonomic improvements.

Trigger
The rifle had a two-stage trigger with considerable take up before the trigger engages the sear. This feature aids in preventing premature firing during stressful (combat) situations.

Sights
Originally the Gewehr 98 sight line had an open post type front sight, and a curved tangent-type rear sight with a V-shaped rear notch, known as the Lange Visier (Lange sight after its designer Lieutenant Colonel Lange). The M/88 cartridge was loaded with full metal jacket projectiles of the round-nosed type.

The standard open iron sight aiming elements consisted of relatively coarse rugged aiming elements making the sightline suitable for rough handling and low light usage, but less suitable for aiming at small point targets. The tracks of the rear sight obstructed the view to the sides during aiming. The sights were designed with distant area fire targets like charging horseman units in mind, so the standard iron sight line could be calibrated for very long ranges. Military doctrine in the late 19th and early 20th centuries considered firing at distant area targets, where an officer would call out the range and the soldiers shot in volley, normal.

German government driven efforts to improve the performance of the military M/88 ammunition and the service arms in which the M/88 was used resulted in the design by the Gewehr-Prüfungskommission and adaptation in 1903 of the dimensionally redesigned 7.92×57mm Mauser chambering. Besides the chambering, the bore (designated as "S-bore") was also dimensionally redesigned. The 1903 pattern 7.92×57mm Mauser S Patrone (S ball cartridge) was loaded with a lighter , pointed Spitzgeschoß (spitzer bullet) of  diameter and more powerful double-base (based on nitrocellulose and nitroglycerin) smokeless powder. With the improved ballistic coefficient of the new spitzer bullet, the 1903 pattern cartridge had an improved maximum effective range and a flatter trajectory, and was therefore less critical of range estimation compared to the M/88 cartridge.

Stock
The Gewehr 98 oil finished rifle stock features a semi-pistol grip. A top handguard was standard on all rifles and extended from the front of the rear sight base terminating just ahead of the bottom barrel band. A steel cross bolt was mounted to distribute the forces and hence the effects of recoil on the stock bedding, reducing the chance to split the stock. The stock featured a quick detachable sling swivel on the underside of the butt stock, a top swivel located underneath the bottom barrel band, and a parade hook mounted on the underside of the top H-style barrel band. The prewar stocks were produced from walnut wood and were aged for an average of three years to allow the wood to stabilize. Beginning in 1917, walnut shortages necessitated the use of beech wood. The late-war production beech stocks were less durable and heavier than the original walnut stocks.

Accessories
The rifle was issued with a leather carrying sling. During the duration of World War I, due to a shortage of leather, slings were produced out of canvas.

The rifle was able to fire rifle grenades. Various attachable rifle grenade launcher models were designed during World War I.

The Gewehr 98 was designed to be used with a bayonet. The long bearing surface on the Gewehr 98 bayonet lug eliminated the addition of a muzzle ring. The advantage of this solution lies in the fact that muzzle rings can interfere with barrel oscillation which can significantly impede the accuracy of a rifle. The rifle was originally issued with the Seitengewehr 98 pattern bayonet. By the end of 1905, this bayonet began to be replaced with the more robust and practical Seitengewehr 98/05, with a  blade. It was called the "Butcher Blade" by the Allies due to its distinctive shape, and was initially intended for artillerymen and engineers as a chopping tool as well as a weapon. Towards the end of World War I, the  blade Seitengewehr 84/98 was introduced as an economy measure and because the longer models were impractical in narrow trenches; this model became standard issue during the Weimar Republic and Third Reich. Serrated, saw-backed versions of the standard patterns intended to be used as tools were carried by German Pioniere (pioneers).

Variants

Sniper models

In the spring of 1915, it was decided to fit 15,000 Gewehr 98 rifles, selected for being exceptionally accurate during factory tests, with telescopic sights for sniper use, though the Gewehr 98 was not designed for use with aiming optics. The Scharfschützen-Gewehr 98 (sniper rifle 98) was officially adapted in 1915 featuring for the period advanced 4× Görtz or Zeiss telescopic sights. These sights were mounted offset to the left to allow stripper clip loading of the rifle and the sights had a bullet drop compensation sight drum out to 1,000 m range in 100 m increments. The bolt handle had to be turned-down from its original straight design. In the stock, a recess had to be made to accommodate the turned-down bolt handle modification.

The wartime Scharfschützen-Gewehr 98 program intended to regularize equipment issued for snipers but failed. The telescopic sights used consisted of 2.5×, 3× and 4× models, made by manufactures like Görtz, Gérard, Oigee, Zeiss, Hensoldt, Voigtländer and various civilian models from manufacturers like Bock, Busch and Füss. Several different mountings produced by various manufacturers were used. Even with a turned-down bolt handle (unless it is low-profile as is common practice with modern hunting rifles), optics mounted low directly above the receiver will not leave enough space between the rifle and the telescopic sight body for unimpaired operation of the bolt or three-position safety catch lever. This ergonomic problem was solved by mounting the telescopic sight relatively high above the receiver. By the end of World War I, 18,421 Gewehr 98 rifles were converted and equipped with telescopic sights and issued to German snipers.

Karabiner 98a

Not to be confused with the later Karabiner 98k or the earlier Karabiner 98A (uppercase A), the Karabiner 98a (Kar 98a) was a shorter version of the Gewehr 98 originally made for cavalry and support unit use. The Karabiner 98A, adopted in February 1902, had a considerably shorter barrel than the Gewehr 98 and was also lighter at  empty. Experiments in 1904 with Karabiner 98A carbines rechambered for the S Patrone cartridge showed excessive recoil and muzzle flash problems, leading to the suspension of production in 1905.
The Gewehr Prüfungs Kommission (GPK) started developing a new carbine with a longer barrel and a different stock to address these problems; by the mid-summer of 1907, the longer barrelled prototype carbines showed more acceptable recoil and muzzle blast behavior with the S Patrone.

In January 1908, the Karabiner Model 1898 AZ (Kar 98AZ) was accepted for service. The new features were a small diameter receiver ring, tapered rather than stepped barrel contour, an L-shaped stacking rod attached to the stock near the muzzle, and a turned-down bolt handle and recess in the stock in the same fashion as the Gewehr 98s sniper variant. The "AZ" stands for "Aufpflanz-und-Zusammensetzvorrichtung", meaning "with bayonet attachment point and stacking rod". At the end of World War I about 1,500,000 short rifles had been produced. In 1923, the AZ was renamed to 'a', as Germany sought to distinguish the model from the newer 'b' and 'k' models.

During World War I, the Karabiner 98a was issued to light infantry, cavalry, mountain troops, and later to assault troops. It was liked because it was lighter and shorter than the Gewehr 98, and was thus better suited for use in trench assaults.

Karabiner 98b
The Karabiner 98b was not technically another "carbine" variant, but rather was a rifle designated as a carbine to comply with the terms of the Treaty of Versailles which only allowed Germany to produce carbines. The Karabiner Model 1898b was introduced in 1923. The Karabiner 98b had a tangent rear sight as opposed to the original "Lange" ramp sight, a wider lower band with side sling attachment bar, a side butt attachment point for a sling, and a turned down bolt handle. It was otherwise merely a modified form of the Gewehr 98, from which the Karabiner 98k was derived.

Variants comparison

Combat service
The Gewehr 98 saw service primarily in World War I, as well as the Boxer Rebellion and the Herero Wars in the preceding years. As with all contemporary bolt-action rifles, it was a powerful and accurate rifle with long range that was poorly suited for the close quarter fighting of trench warfare. The considerable length of the rifle and the minimum sight setting of 400 meters (far in excess of the typical range in trench battles) were particular handicaps.

Its successor, the Karabiner 98k, would go on to be the standard rifle of the German infantry during World War II. Some Gewehr 98s also saw service in World War II, though many of these older rifles were converted to either 98b or 98k specifications.

Military accuracy standard
For determining accuracy the German military fired a group of shots into a target and used statistics to calculate a hit probability. For this they drew a circle that disregards the hits on the outer part of the target and only count half of the hits (50% or R50) on the inner part of the circle. They then used both the vertical and horizontal measurements of the reduced shotgroup to measure accuracy. When the R50 results are doubled the hit probability increases to 93.7%.

To pass the German military minimum accuracy standard a Gewehr 98 had to perform as follows.

These requirements were carried over for the Karabiner 98k, Germany's standard service rifle during WW2, each rifle having to place 5 out of 5 shots within a 12cm circle at 100 m in order to be accepted for service.

The circular error probable method employed by the Germans and other European militaries cannot be converted and is not comparable to the common US methods (groupsize of 5 or 10 successive shots fired at 100 yards) for determining accuracy and the British method of four out of five successive shots fired at 100 feet must hit a rectangle measuring 1 inch wide × 1.5 inches high

Individual weapons can shoot better or worse than these averages.

The accuracy standards of the Gewehr 98 and most other service rifles used in World War I were similar.

The Gewehr 98 after World War I

Sporting and hunting

M 98
The Mauser M 98 was a civilian version adapted for hunting and other sporting purposes of the Gewehr 98 service rifle. Vaguely similar to the latter rifle in appearance, the M 98 was offered in many different hunting chamberings, not like the original service rifle. The Mauser M 98 series offered several features and factory options, that are also typical for sporterised ex-service rifles, ranging from various technical departures from the basic Mauser service rifle it was based on to luxury wood grades, (gold) inlays, engravings and surface treatments like color case hardening. Some of the available options were originally developed and introduced by John Rigby & Co. on Rigby Mauser hunting rifles.

M 98 magnum
John Rigby & Co. commissioned Mauser to develop the M 98 magnum action in the early 1900s. It was designed to function with the large sized cartridges normally used to hunt Big Five game and other dangerous game species. For this specialized type of hunting, where absolute reliability of the rifle under adverse conditions is very important, the controlled-feed M 98 system remains the standard by which other action designs are judged. In 1911 John Rigby & Co. introduced the .416 Rigby cartridge that due to its dimensions could only be used in the M 98 magnum action.

Rechambered rifles
After World War I, the Treaty of Versailles left Germany extremely constricted in terms of military power. Civilians were not allowed to have any use of standard military weapons or ammunition. Since the 7.92×57mm Mauser round was so stout and great for hunting, people did not want to give up on it, so a redesign of the cartridge was made for the civilian market resulting in the 8×60mm S featuring a new longer case. The 8×60mm S cartridge was kept under  overall length to fit the cartridge in standard military M98 magazine boxes without any modification.

The also rare 8×64mm S cartridge offers a comparable rechambering option for Mauser Gewehr 98 and Karabiner 98k rifles sporting 8mm S-bores. Due to its larger case capacity the 8×64mm S chambering offers better ballistic performance than the 8×60mm S. Some custom rifles were made using Mauser 98's and rechambering them for the 9×57mm Mauser.

Since the purpose for these rifles was hunting and sporting, the bolt handle was professionally bent down, gradually the bent bolt handle became the standard and replaced the older straight style (though that was of course not always the case). The standard military sights were replaced by a 100 m sight, along with a flip-up on the rear sight for 200 m. The military stocks were replaced by newer ones that did not include the extra length of stock needed for the bayonet lug.

Today these sporter rifles are extremely rare and the 8×60mm S, 8×64mm S and 9×57mm Mauser cartridges are nearly obsolete, as only few mainstream ammunition manufacturers along with some other smaller companies continue to produce them. When correct ammunition is used in a converted rifle, an 8×60mm S, 8×64mm S or 9×57mm Mauser modified Gewehr 98 can be an extremely potent and inexpensive long-range big-game rifle.

Also, many Gewehr 98 rifles acquired as trophies by Allied forces during the war and brought to the US were converted to the 8mm-06 wildcat cartridge, a modification of the original 8×57mm IS chambering to 8×63mm S to accommodate the use of the plentiful .30-06 Springfield brass for reloading, with 8mm (.323 caliber) bullets. Such conversions are indistinguishable from unmodified rifle without careful examination, and can be quite dangerous if fired with the shorter 8×57mm ammunition, as the cartridge case will stretch to fit the elongated chamber and possibly rupture in the process, which causes a potentially highly dangerous high pressure propellant gas leakage. However, the Mauser M 98 action is designed specifically to direct gas away from the shooter in the event of a case rupture.

In the 21st century the US based company Rhineland Arms started to produce .45 ACP conversion kits for the Mauser action using M1911 pistol magazines.

Shotgun conversions
Many were converted to shotguns, typically in 12 and 16-gauge, as well as a few in 20-gauge. In making the conversion, both main locking lugs were typically removed. The magazine was altered to allow a single shell in reserve. Many authorities recommend against firing these guns, particularly with modern magnum shotshells.

Weimar Republic and Nazi Germany
The Weimar Republic, the successor state to the German Empire, implemented a program designed to update their remaining supplies of Gewehr 98 rifles for the Reichswehr in the years following World War I. Rifles allowed into service with the early Weimar security forces were stamped with a "1920" marking on their receiver ring. Further updates to Weimar-era Gewehr 98's often included the replacement of the Lange Visier rear sight with a standard Karabiner 98k-style rear sight. Many of the Gew 98 were also converted to the Kar 98b configuration, with a turned bolt handle, new tangent leaf sight and a hole cut through the side of the stock to accommodate a Karabiner 98k-style side-mounted sling system, but some Karabiner 98b were also produced from new parts. Some of these rifles saw use in World War II but mostly in second line units because the shortened and improved Karabiner 98k was the standard issue rifle by that time. Gewehr 98 and Karabiner 98b were sometimes rebuilt to the Karabiner 98k configuration. In 1924 the Gewehr 98 was developed into the Mauser Standardmodell rifle.

During World War II the Germans captured German-made Yugoslav Model 1898 carbines and rifles and designated them Gewehr 298 (j) and Karabiner 492 (j). The Volkssturm ("People's Militia") also made use of the Gewehr 98 and Kar 98a; out of all their mixed arsenal the Gewehr 98 was probably the best since it used standard 7.92×57mm IS rounds and a man trained on a Karabiner 98k could transition over to the Gewehr 98 easily since the actions of both rifles were the same.

After 1945, some ex-German Karabiner 98b were also taken into French Army service, the only modification being the use of the sling of the MAS-36 rifle.

Ottoman Empire
The Ottoman Empire bought the Mauser Model 1903. The Mauser 1903 was a modified version Gewehr 98. The Lange Visier sight was replaced by a tangent leaf sight, the nose cap was simplified, the rifle could be fitted with older Ottoman M1890 bayonets. The weapon had curved arm on its bolt stop to block the cartridge clip when the cartridges are stripped into the magazine. It also had a larger receiver and a longer cocking cam and firing pin than the German variant. After the adoption of the long rifle, 200,000 were received before 1905. 406 Marine-gewehre were delivered to the Ottoman Navy in 1904, 7,617 to the Gendarmerie in Ottoman Macedonia. 1,100 more, modified to fire spitzer bullets and sometimes known as M1910, were ordered in 1910. The Ottoman customs also received some. The Model 1905 carbine was produced between 1903 and 1906. 30,000 M1908 carbines were delivered in 1908 and 1909.

The Model 1903 saw combat during the Italo-Turkish War, the Balkan Wars, World War I and the Turkish War of Independence. After World War I, most of these weapons were modified to fire the 7.92×57mm Mauser round. Many of the long rifles were refurbished as Mauser Model 1938 short rifles. Models 1903 and 1905 were still in service in the 1960s, large numbers of Gewehr 98 rifles were also given to the Ottoman Empire both during and after World War I, including the majority of 1916 Waffenfabrik Oberndorf production.  Many of these rifles were converted to the "M38" standard by the Republic of Turkey in the years before, during, and after World War I. Today these rifles are widely available in North America along with other Turkish Mausers.  Careful observation is usually needed to tell an Ex-Gewehr 98 apart from the myriad of other common M38-standard Mausers.

Czechoslovakia
After Czechoslovakia was founded in 1918, they bought 57 000 Gewehr 98 rifles from Netherlands (the so-called Netherlands block), which was acquired from disarmed German troops on Netherlands territory. After examination of Gewehr 98 Czechoslovakia developed own improved version known as Puška vz. 24 (Rifle mod. 24). That rifle, produced from 1924 to 1942, became the standard weapon of Czechoslovak forces before WWII and up to the 1960s. It was also commercially successful - among users were Romania, China, Bolivia, Turkey, Japan, Spain, Iran (also locally produced under licence), Ecuador, Brasil, Lithuania, Yugoslavia; after WWII also Israel, North Vietnam and many others).

Spanish Civil War
The rifle saw some usage in the Spanish Civil War, mostly in the hands of Generalissimo Franco's Nationalists and German volunteer legions. Most of these rifles were bought and exported to the United States as cheap sporting rifles in the 1960s by Interarmco.

Poland
After the Second Polish Republic got its independence from the German Empire the Polish government got control over the state arsenal in former Danzig. The tools and machine park was moved to Warsaw to set up a state arsenal to equip the new Polish army. The machine park was set up to produce German G98 rifles and Kar98AZ carbines. A nearly unchanged version of the G98 was produced an accepted by the Polish army as Karabin wz.1898 abbreviated and marked G98 or W98 for infantry use. In 1921 a Polish version of the German Kar98AZ was produced for the cavalry accepted as Karabinek wz. 1898 abbreviated and marked K98 a remarkable difference is the strengthen staking hook. Problems with this carbine surfaced including intense muzzle blast and flash. In 1939 the K98 was phased out in favor to the K29 a Polish version of the Czech vz. 24 this carbine was not satisfactory either. This led to the development of the K98a.

Israel

During the formation of the state of Israel in the aftermath of World War II, the Haganah acquired substantial numbers of Karabiner 98k rifles from any European sources they could find. Some of these rifles were converted Gewehr 98 rifles, which aside from the Imperial German markings are identical to all other Israeli Mausers. Like other Israeli Mausers, most of these rifles were rebarreled for 7.62×51mm NATO after that round was adopted as the Israeli standard in 1958.

Non-German Gewehr 98 derivatives 
Many non-German military service rifles and carbines were derived from and/or based on the Mauser M98 bolt-action system. Some of these were German-made by various contractors other than Mauser:
 M1902 and M1936 Mexican in 7×57mm Mauser
 M1903 Turkish in 7.65×53mm Mauser
 M1907 Chinese in 6.8×57mm
 M1904 Portuguese in 6.5×58mm Vergueiro, 7×57mm Mauser and 7.92×57mm Mauser
 M1907 and M1908 Brazilian in 7×57mm Mauser
 M1909 Argentine in 7.65×53mm Mauser
 M1910 Serbian in 7×57mm Mauser
 Steyr Model 1912 Mauser for Mexico, Chile and Colombia, in 7×57mm Mauser

Following the collapse of the German Empire after World War I, many countries that were using Mauser models chose to develop, assemble, or modify their own rifle designs that were derived from and/or based on the Mauser M98 bolt-action:
 vz. 98/22 Often made from Gewehr 98 parts, rebuilt in the Zbrojovka Brno factory in Czechoslovakia.
 M1924 type Zhongzheng rifle Chinese in 7.92×57mm Mauser
 vz. 24 Czechoslovakia in 7.92×57mm Mauser, 7×57mm Mauser and 7.65×53mm Argentine
 vz. 33 Czechoslovakia in 7.92×57mm Mauser
 M1924 and M1930 made by the Belgian Fabrique Nationale
 M1935 Belgian in 7.65×53mm Mauser
 Karabinek wz. 1898 K98 Polish in 7.92×57mm Mauser
 Karabinek wz. 1929 Polish in 7.92×57mm Mauser
 Kb wz. 98a Polish in 7.92×57mm Mauser
 M1943 Spanish short (not to be confused with the M93 Spanish Mauser) in 7.92×57mm Mauser manufactured in the Spanish arsenals. Will have "La Coruña" or the Spanish Air Force Eagle stamped on the top of the receiver. Virtually identical to the Karabiner 98k.

The Winchester Model 54 and later the popular Winchester Model 70 are both based on the Mauser style action.

After World War II the Mauser M98 bolt-action system was used by Yugoslavia to design the Zastava M48 and Spain to design the FR8.

Users

:Use Repetiergewehr M.14 in World War I
: 200.000 units bought in its Mauser 1909 variant form.
: post-WWI
: most imported after the first world war

:300 DWM Mauser Model 1907 short rifle and Steyr-made Model 1912s 
 : some converted as training rifles post-WWII
: acquired during the interwar period
 : some Kar 98a after WW1, Kar 98b after WW2.
: Standard issue rifle.
: Kar98a and Kar98b versions, in compliance to restrictions set by the Treaty of Versailles.
: Used initially by snipers, and then by Volkssturm units.
: In July of 1921, a shipment of Gewehr 98s and Mauser C96 pistols were smuggled in to Waterford by Charles McGuinness.
: purchased Steyr-made Model 1907s between 1907 and 1910 and Steyr-made Model 1912s until 1914
: Used a modified version Gewehr 98 known as the Mauser Model 1903 (also known as the Ottoman Mauser), after Turkish War of Independence most were converted to the '''M38'' standard by the Republic of Turkey.
: Bought around 50,000 Model 1909 rifles (export version of the Gew. 98) between 1910 and 1914.
: Ex-German rifles after WWI. Copies of the Kar98a and G98 were produced as Karabin wz. 98/W98 (Rifle 98) and Karabinek wz. 98/K98 (carbine 98) in Państwowa Fabryka Karabinów in Warsaw and Fabryka Broni in Radom
:A few Infanteriegewehr 98 and Karabiner 98AZ rifles were obtained as reparations from Germany after WWI

: post-WWI, mostly converted to the M24B configuration. Those kept in service were designated Puška 7,9 mm M 98 (Gew 98) and Karabini 7,9 mm M98 (Kar 98AZ).

See also
List of infantry weapons of World War I

References

Bibliography
 
 
 
Dr. Dieter Storz "Gewehr & Karabiner 98: Die Schußwaffen 98 des deutschen Reichsheeres von 1898 bis 1918."
Dr. Dieter Storz "Deutsche Militärgewehre (Band 1): Vom Werdergewehr bis zum Modell 71/84."
Dr. Dieter Storz "Deutsche Militärgewehre (Band 2): Schußwaffen 88 und 91 sowie Zielß und Fechtgewehre, seitengewehre und Patronentaschen."

External links

Germany's Karabiner 98AZ, Garry James, gunsandammo.com
Mauser model 98 at guns.ru
French Gewehr 98 and Karabiner 98a Page – use the index to choose a particulare rifle variant 
October 2009+07:25:52 Exploded view drawing of the Mauser Model 98 controlled-feed bolt-action
Historical Summary and Disassembly instructions for the Gewehr 98 from American Rifleman

1898 establishments in Germany
1918 disestablishments in Germany
Bolt-action rifles
Rifles of Germany
World War I German infantry weapons
Weapons of the Ottoman Empire
World War II infantry weapons of Germany
7.92×57mm Mauser rifles
Mauser rifles
Weapons and ammunition introduced in 1898